The Palace of the Republic was a building in Berlin that hosted the Volkskammer, the parliament of East Germany, from 1976 to 1990.

The Palace of the Republic, also known as the "People's Palace", was located on Museum Island in the Mitte area of East Berlin, on the site of the former Berlin Palace between the Lustgarten and Schlossplatz, near the West Berlin border. The Palast was completed in 1976 to house the Volkskammer, also serving various cultural purposes including two large auditoria, art galleries, a theatre, a cinema, 13 restaurants, 5 beer halls, a bowling alley, 4 pool rooms, a billiards room, a rooftop skating rink, a private gym with spa, a casino, a medical station, a post office, a police station with an underground cellblock, an indoor basketball court, an indoor swimming pool, private barbershops and salons, public and private restrooms and a discothèque. In the early 1980s, a video game arcade for the children of Volkskammer members and staff replaced one of the restaurants.

In 1990, the Palast became vacant following German reunification and was closed for health reasons, due to there being more than 5,000 tonnes of asbestos in the building (despite asbestos being outlawed in construction in East Germany in 1968). In 2003, the Bundestag voted for the demolition of the Palast and replacement with a reconstruction of the Berlin Palace which had been demolished in the 1950s, after being heavily damaged by Allied air raids. The Palast was demolished between 2006 and 2008, and the reconstruction of the Berlin Palace began in 2013 and was completed in 2020.

History

Construction 
Construction of the Palace of the Republic began in 1973, with a cost stated at 485 million East German marks according to an internal list of Wolfgang Junker, the Minister of Construction, although other estimates suggest about 800 million to 1 billion marks. It was built on the site of the Berlin Palace (Stadtschloss), the former royal palace of Prussia, located on Museum Island in East Berlin, less than  along Unter den Linden from the West Berlin border at the Brandenburg Gate. The Berlin Palace had been controversially demolished in 1950 after suffering extensive damage during the Battle of Berlin in World War II, as the government had no budget in the post-war years for the restoration and it was viewed as a symbol of Prussian imperialism. The site was used as a parade ground and parking lot during the 1950s and 1960s until its designation as the location for a new building to seat the Volkskammer, the unicameral legislature of the GDR, which was provisionally seated at the Langenbeck-Virchow-Haus at 58/59 Luisenstraße.

The Palast was designed in a modernist style by Heinz Graffunder and the Building Academy of the German Democratic Republic (Bauakademie der DDR), with distinctive bronze-mirrored windows as a defining architectural feature. The new building took up the eastern half of the plot while the western half was intended as a military parade ground, though tremors from the heavy vehicles were found to endanger the glass facade on the unstable grounds of Museum Island. Instead, the western half was used mainly as a parking lot and military parades were moved to Karl-Marx-Allee.

In addition to housing the Volkskammer, the Palast was intended as a multiple-use structure influenced by the concepts of Palaces of Culture and People's Houses popular with socialist movements. Such cultural buildings were common not only in the Eastern Bloc, but also find examples in Belgium, France (Center Georges Pompidou), the Netherlands and Sweden (House of Culture in Stockholm) Buildings led. In the young Soviet Union in particular, cultural centers became symbols of the new state power. The Palast contained a large bowling alley at the lower level, from which the canal-side terrace along the River Spree could be accessed, and featured Brunswick lane equipment and a bar. The part of the Palace open to the public featured numerous cameras for the surveillance of staff and visitors by Stasi officials. It was the first building in the GDR to feature a self-supporting steel skeleton and contained 5,000 tons of asbestos used for fire protection.

Seat of the Volkskammer

The Palast was officially opened on 23 April 1976 and its facilities were opened to the public two days later.

Numerous important cultural, political, academic, and social events of the German Democratic Republic occurred at the Palast after its opening. Events were held in the Palast's Great Hall, a large hexagonal room some 67 meters wide and 18 meters high. The Great Hall was notable for its versatility; lifting devices under the floor allowed for a stage of variable height and size. The surface area of the stage could thus range anywhere from 170 to 1000 m², and the hall could seat between 1000 and 4500 attendants. Many editions of the GDR television entertainment program Ein Kessel Buntes were recorded in the Great Hall. Concerts of famous orchestras such as the Gewandhausorchester Leipzig under Kurt Masur, modern interpretations of classical music such as the Messiah of George Frideric Handel, and performances by Bulat Okudzhava (29 November 1976), Harry Belafonte (25 October 1983), Karel Gott (1983), 1986 with Dara Rolins and Heidi Janků, 1987) or of the rock-band Purple Schulz (21 January 1989). German electronic music group Tangerine Dream performed a concert recorded live at the Palast on 31 January 1980 which also was Johannes Schmoelling's first live performance with the band. Erich Honecker, Willi Stoph and other members of the Central Committee were in attendance. The concert was unique in that Tangerine Dream was the first Western group who was allowed by the GDR government to play in East Berlin at the time and was dubbed "the performance behind the Iron Curtain". An album of this recorded concert was released titled Quichotte on East German record label Amiga, and later released to the rest of the world on Virgin Records six years later and renamed Pergamon. In October 1983, the West German rock star Udo Lindenberg was permitted to perform in concert at the Palast.  At the concert, Lindenberg did not sing one of his best-known songs, "Sonderzug nach Pankow" ("Special Train to Pankow"), which satirized East German leader Erich Honecker, as he was ordered not to play it under threat of arrest and imprisonment by the Stasi. Additionally, in April 1987, American Latin rock band Santana did two concerts here.

The Socialist Unity Party (SED), the ruling party of the GDR, held party congresses at the Palast and a state gala was held on the eve of the 40th (and final) anniversary of the GDR in October 1989, at which Soviet leader Mikhail Gorbachev was present. During the night of 22–23 August 1990, the Volkskammer decided in the Palast on the accession of the GDR to the Federal Republic of Germany with effect from 3 October 1990, known as German reunification.

The Palast had many nicknames in the Springer press in West Berlin and among East German citizens, such as "Palazzo Prozzo" (a wordplay, as 'protzen' means 'to show off') or "Erichs Lampenladen" (Erich Honecker's lamp shop).

Closure and demolition
The Palast was closed to the public on 19 September 1990 by decree of the Volkskammer when it was found to be contaminated by asbestos, only two weeks before the accession date. On 2 October 1990, the Volkskammer was dissolved and the Palast became vacant. By 2003, the asbestos was considered to have been removed along with internal and external fittings allowing either safe reconstruction or safe deconstruction, and the shell of the building was opened for visitors in mid-2003. In November 2003, the Bundestag decided to demolish the Palast and reconstruct the Berlin Palace, leaving the area as parkland until funding could be found. The majority of former East Germans opposed the demolition and various protests were held by people who felt the building was an integral part of Berlin's culture and the historic process of the German reunification.

Beginning in early 2004, the Palast was used for events, such as housing an exhibition of the Terracotta Army and a special concert by the famous Berlin-based band Einstürzende Neubauten. Afterward, the Palast fell into disuse and disrepair. Demolition started on 6 February 2006, and was scheduled to last about fifteen months at a cost of €12 million, however the demolition lasted longer than scheduled because of hazards to neighbouring buildings. Dismantling of the structure was seriously delayed after more asbestos was discovered in various locations, and the estimated completion date was pushed back to the end of 2008. About 35,000 tonnes of steel which once held this building together were shipped to the United Arab Emirates to be used for the construction of the Burj Khalifa. Although the original structure in Berlin has been demolished, its sister building, the Kulturpalast in Dresden, is still intact and currently used as a symphony orchestra hall.

Berlin Palace reconstruction
In January 2006, about two years after the Bundestag decided for the rebuilding of the Berlin Palace, a second definitive vote re-approved the plans. It  was decided three of its sides would be exact replicas of the original, but the fourth side and interior would be modern. Called the Humboldtforum, the rebuilt palace will house the Humboldt collection and gallery of non-European art. In November 2008, the Italian architect Francesco Stella was chosen for the project. Reconstruction was completed in 2020.

Artworks 
Sixteen monumental pictures by GDR artists (Walter Womacka, Willi Sitte, Wolfgang Mattheuer, Werner Tübke, and Bernhard Heisig) presented Dreams of Communists. The pictures were shown in Potsdam 20 years later.

Gallery

See also
Centre Georges Pompidou
Finlandia Hall
Internationales Congress Centrum Berlin
State Kremlin Palace
Great Hall of the People

References

External links

Stop motion video of the demolition of the Palast der Republik.
Opening of the Palace of the Republic in 1976. 
Brokedown Palast – documentary film about the destruction of the Palast 
Palast der Republik, at Schlossplatz, Historic Centre of Berlin   (with pictures)
Zwischenpalastnutzung (Temporary Palace Use) 
Documentary at Frontline/World 
A site about the Palace 
About the Palace in Berlin  (with a lot of pictures)
Volkspalast, Special Prize of the Jury of the European Prize for Urban Public Space 2006
fensterzumhof.eu: Deconstruction of the Volkspalast  (photo series)
"Dismantling, not Demolishing" (Short Ethnographic Film on the Deconstruction of PdR)
Memories of East Germany's Showcase: New Book Reveals Last Photographs of Berlin's Palast der Republik

Government buildings completed in 1976
Buildings and structures in Mitte
Convention centres in Germany
1970s in Berlin
Legislative buildings in Europe
Seats of national legislatures
Volkskammer
Republic
1976 establishments in East Germany
Buildings and structures demolished in 2008
2008 disestablishments in Germany
Buildings and structures of East Berlin
Demolished buildings and structures in Berlin